For the 1929 Tour de France, Nicolas Frantz had won the preceding two Tours and was looking for a third. In addition the 1926 Tour winner, Lucien Buysse, was looking for another title.

The entire podium in 1928 was occupied by members from the Alcyon cycling team. The tour organisation wanted the Tour to be an individual race, so in 1929 the teams were not officially recognised, and riders started in the A-category (professional cyclists) or as touriste-routiers (semi-professional or amateur).

By starting number

By nationality

References

1929 Tour de France
1929